Mar Vista Gardens is a housing project at 11965 Allin Street in Del Rey, a district of southwestern Los Angeles County, California near Culver City, bordering Ballona Creek and Sepulveda Creek Channel. It is operated by the Housing Authority of the City of Los Angeles (HACLA).

Designed by architect Albert Criz, it was completed in 1954 as one of the slum clearance measures that were inspired by the Federal Housing Act of 1949.

It is the westernmost large housing project in the Housing Authority of the City of Los Angeles (HACLA) system, and contains 62 buildings and 601 apartments, some of which overlook Ballona Creek. In addition to housing units, the Gardens has athletic fields, handball courts, a gymnasium and a community center. A part-time health clinic is located inside the community center. As of 2020, it is a home for more than 1800 residents.

Mar Vista Gardens, while not located in Culver City proper, has used a Culver City mailing address. When originally built, the area was home to primarily Caucasian families seeking affordable housing. By the 1960s, demographics of the project changed to a predominantly Latino residency. In the 1970s, Mar Vista Gardens saw the rise of the Culver City Boyz, an infamous Chicano street gang. In 2003, some of the Culver City Boyz had been expelled from public housing due to the implementation and enforcement of strict rules. However, the gang remains active, as the constitutionality of the injunction has been tested.  Alleged members of the gang settled a class action suit over the practice of enforcing curfews for suspected gang members with the City of Los Angeles for $30 million of job training and apprenticeships for members of the class action suit.

In 2013, Mar Vista was part of a pilot project to allow free access to the Internet for residents in order to help close the digital divide.

The complex was listed on the National Register of Historic Places in 2018.

Additional images

Zoned schools
Residents of the complex are zoned to schools in the Los Angeles Unified School District.
 Stoner Ave. Elementary School
 Braddock Drive Elementary School
 Marina del Rey Middle School
 Venice High School

Notable residents
Art Alexakis (born 1962) lead singer of the band Everclear
Yolanda del Río (born 1976) rancheras singer
Todd Bridges (born 1965) actor

References

External links

Public housing in Los Angeles
Westside (Los Angeles County)
Ballona Creek
National Register of Historic Places in Los Angeles
Del Rey, Los Angeles
Residential buildings completed in 1954
1954 establishments in California